The Grasshopper was a horse that competed in the sport of eventing, and is most notable for being one of only five horses to have competed in six or more CCIOs.

The Grasshopper, foaled in Ireland under the name "Copper Coin," was by the little Thoroughbred Tutor, who was known as a producer of show jumpers and eventers. He was first purchased by Col. Joe Dudgeon as a ride for his son, Ian. Ian Dudgeon took the horse to the top, competing him in the 1956 Olympic Games in Stockholm, where they had a clear cross-country round but were eliminated for missing a flag.

Grasshopper was then sold to Mrs. John Galvin, who shipped him to her ranch in Santa Barbara, California. Mrs. Calvin invited the United States Eventing Team to her ranch to train two years later, and Michael Page was assigned to ride Grasshopper. The pair had an excellent career, with an individual gold in both the 1959 Pan American Games in Chicago and the 1963 Pan Am Games in São Paulo, Brazil. They continued their career with the Rome Olympics in 1960 and the 1964 Tokyo Olympics, the latter in which Grasshopper was on the silver medal team.

The little horse is most known to be one of only five horses in the sport to have competed in six or more CCIOs (Official International Team Competitions). He shares this honor with another great American horse, Kilkenny, as well as three British horses: The Poacher, Random Light and Priceless.

Grasshopper's final rider said of him: "Grasshopper was neither very big nor very handsome, but such was his toughness, mentally and physically, that he never started an international event in which he was not expected to produce the fastest time cross-country... I don't expect ever to see another horse like him." Michael O. Page

Achievements
 1955 European Championships – Penelope Moreton
 1956 Melbourne Olympic Games – Ian Dudgeon
 1959 Chicago Pan American Games – Michael Page: individual gold and team silver
 1960 Rome Olympic Games – Michael Page: 7th individually
 1963 São Paulo Pan American Games – Michael Page: individual and team gold
 1964 Tokyo Olympic Games – Michael Page: 4th individually, team silver

Eventing horses
1948 animal births
Horses in the Olympics